Star Peak is both the highest and most topographically prominent mountain in both the Humboldt Range and Pershing County in Nevada, United States. It is the sixth-most topographically prominent peak in Nevada. The peak is on public land administered by the Bureau of Land Management and has no access restrictions.

See also
 List of Ultras of the United States

References

External links
 
 

Mountains of Pershing County, Nevada